Audra may refer to:
 Audra (given name)
 Audra, West Virginia, an unincorporated community on the Middle Fork River in Barbour County, West Virginia, United States
 Audra (band), an Arizona-based American musical band